Radegast is a Czech beer brewed in Nošovice, Moravian-Silesian Region, Czech Republic since 1970. The beer is named after the Slavic god Radegast. Stemming from the name for the beer is the slogan: "Život je hořký: Bohudík", a Czech phrase which translates into English as "Life is bitter: Thank God" (in reference to the beer's "bitter" taste). 

The brewery is owned by Pilsner Urquell (since 1999), which is, in turn, owned by Asahi Breweries. Radegast is the most popular beer in Moravia.

Products 
The company brews the following different varieties of beer:

Gallery

See also 
 Beer in the Czech Republic

References

External links 

 Radegast Birell official pages (Czech)

Beer in the Czech Republic
Beer brands of the Czech Republic
SABMiller